Franciska Rosenkilde (born 19 March 1976) is a Danish geographer and politician who has been the leader of The Alternative since February 2021, replacing Josephine Fock. Alongside five other members of The Alternative, Rosenkilde was elected to the Folketing in November 2022.

Education and civil career
Rosenkilde has a professional bachelor's degree in health and nutrition from Metropol University College, which she studied from 2006 to 2010. In 2012, she began a master's degree in geography from the University of Copenhagen, which she completed in 2015. A study she completed with her thesis on food systems and climate change.

Prior to her political career, she worked as a chef and as a mediator of diet and lifestyle.

Political career
Rosenkilde became a member of The Alternative in 2014 after a political debate in the party at Bremen Teater.

In 2017, she was elected to the Copenhagen City Council in the local elections. Here she sat as a member of the Citizens' Representation and The Alternative's group chairperson at Copenhagen City Hall until October 2018.

In October 2018, after a vote in The Alternative in Copenhagen, Rosenkilde was elected to the post of Mayor of Culture and Leisure, after the party's former mayor, Niko Grünfeld, had resigned. She received 97 votes out of 188.

Party leadership
At an extraordinary national meeting, on 7 February 2021, she was elected by party members to become political leader of the Alternative. Four candidates ran, and Rosenkilde received 260 votes out of a total of 471.

References 

Living people
1976 births
The Alternative (Denmark) politicians
Politicians from Copenhagen
21st-century Danish politicians
21st-century Danish women politicians
Danish geographers
Mayors of places in Denmark
Women mayors of places in Denmark
Leaders of political parties in Denmark
Members of the Folketing 2022–2026
Women members of the Folketing